Xantener Sommerfestspiele  was a theatre festival held in Xanten, North Rhine-Westphalia, Germany.

Theatre festivals in Germany